A roulade is a dish of filled rolled meat or pastry. Roulade can be savory or sweet. Swiss roll is an example of a sweet roulade. Traditionally found in various European cuisines, the term roulade originates from the French word rouler, meaning "to roll".

Meat
A meat-based roulade typically consists of a slice of steak rolled around a filling such as cheese, vegetables, or other meats. A roulade, like a braised dish, is often browned then covered with wine or stock and cooked. Such a roulade is commonly secured with a toothpick, metal skewer or a piece of string. The roulade is sliced into rounds and served. Of this common form, there are several notable dishes:
Paupiette, French veal roulade filled with vegetables, fruits or sweetmeats
Rinderroulade, German and Hungarian beef roulade filled with onions, bacon and pickles. Also Kohlrouladen, cabbage filled with minced meat.
Španělské ptáčky (Spanish birds) are roulade in Czech cuisine. The recipe is practically identical with German Rouladen, perhaps omitting wine and adding a wedge of hard boiled egg and/or frankfurter to the filling.
Szüz tekercsek ("Virgin rouladen"), in Hungary a dish filled with minced meat.
Zrazy (or "rolada"), in Poland
Rollade, in the Netherlands. Most 'rollades' are made from rolled pork. A typical Dutch 'rollade' is not filled. Common spices are pepper, salt and nutmeg.

Involtini
In Italian cuisine, roulades are known as involtini (singular involtino). Involtini can be thin slices of beef, pork, or chicken rolled with a filling of grated cheese (usually Parmesan cheese or Pecorino Romano), sometimes egg to give consistency and some combination of additional ingredients such as bread crumbs, other cheeses, minced prosciutto, ham or Italian sausage, mushrooms, onions, garlic, spinach, pinoli (pine nuts), etc. Involtini (diminutive form of involti) means "little bundles". Each involtino is held together by a wooden toothpick, and the dish is usually served (in various sauces: red, white, etc.) as a second course.  When cooked in tomato sauce, the sauce itself is used to toss the pasta for the first course, giving a consistent taste to the whole meal.

In southern parts of Italy such as Sicily, where fish are a more plentiful element of cuisine, involtini can sometimes be made with fish such as swordfish. This term encompasses dishes like braciole (a roulade consisting of beef, pork or chicken usually filled with Parmesan cheese, bread crumbs and eggs) and saltimbocca.

Pastry

Some roulades consist of cake (often sponge cake) baked in a flat pan rolled around a filling. Cake rolled around jam, chocolate buttercream, nuts or other fillings, is an example of a sweet roulade like the bejgli or the Swiss roll. The bûche de Noël or "Yule log" is a traditional French Christmas cake roll, often decorated with frosting made to look like bark.

Another form of non-meat roulade consists of a soufflé-type mixture baked in a flat pan rolled around a filling.

See also
Slavink
Negimaki
Matambre
Rullepølse

References

Garde manger
Austrian cuisine
Hungarian cuisine
French cuisine
German cuisine
Italian meat dishes
Swiss cuisine
Culinary terminology
Italian cuisine